Othmar, also spelled Otmar or Ottmar, is a masculine German given name, derived from the Germanic name Audamar, from the elements aud "wealth, prosperity" and mar "fame".

Notable people with the name include:

Saint Othmar
Othmar Ammann
Otmar Emminger 
Otmar Freiherr von Verschuer
Otmar Hasler
Ottmar Hörl
Ottmar Hitzfeld
Otmar Issing
Othmar Karas
Ottmar Liebert
Ottmar Luscinius 
Ottmar Mergenthaler
Othmar Muller von Blumencorn
Othmar Reiser 
Othmar Schoeck
Othmar Spann
Othmar Zeidler
Otmar Szafnauer
Othmar Gispert

Fictional characters 
King Ottmar in the Legacy of Kain series

See also 
Ottomar
Omar (name)
Otto
Ademar

External links

German masculine given names